"Faldita" (English: "Short Skirt") is a song by Peruvian singer Leslie Shaw with Venezuelan duo Mau y Ricky. It was released by Sony Music and was Shaw's first international release and as the lead single of her 2020 EP. In early 2020, the song was voted as the Best Latina collaboration with Mau y Ricky on a Billboard Magazine survey with over 50 percent of the votes.

Live Performances
Leslie Shaw and Mau y Ricky performed the song at the Calle Ocho Music Festival in Miami on March 10, 2019. Leslie Shaw also performed the song on several television shows including Despierta America.

Commercial performance
The song performed well being certified gold in Perú and a month later it went platinum in the country where it also quickly became trending topic on Spotify. The platinum certification was given to Shaw while she was opening for Maluma during his concert in Perú.

The song reached number 2 in Perú becoming Shaw's highest chart single in the country after a while and was eventually certified quadruple platinum there. The song also entered charts in Ecuador and Colombia becoming her first song to enter charts outside her native Perú and her most charted song until the release of Estoy Soltera in 2020.

Music video
The music video for the song was released on March 7, 2019 on Leslie Shaw's Vevo channel. The video was filmed in Havana, Cuba and features Shaw dancing around town wearing different skirts. The video reached 50 million views in 6 months of its release.

Charts

Weekly charts

Year-end charts

Certifications and sales

Awards and nominations
The song won Best Pop/Urban Song at the Premios Fama in 2019. It was also nominated for Hit of the Year at the Premios Luces in 2019.

References

Peruvian songs
2019 singles
Spanish-language songs
2019 songs
Leslie Shaw songs